A smoke hole (smokehole, smoke-hole) is a hole in a roof for the smoke from a fire to vent. Before the invention of the smoke hood or chimney, many dwellings had smoke holes to allow the smoke from the hearth to escape. Pre-modern English homes with unglazed windows or thatch roofs required no special vent for smoke. These structures typically had only one story for living spaces, and inhabitants made do with a band of relatively clear air near the ground.

Smoke holes in buildings 
Smoke holes were often built in a way such they would not leak water such as with a covering or in the gables. In the Native American long house, smoke holes occur in intervallic square openings along the roof.

Smoke holes for tents 
In Native American plains style tipi, the smoke hole consisted of one easily accessible smoke flap vent which was positioned around the apex of the interior beams and the flaps were extended outward on poles to open the vent. In modern ceremonial tipis this vent is in the traditional fashion.

Sami tents called a lavvu also have a smoke hole from which smoke from a campfire is vented out the top.  Unlike the Native American tipi however, there are no smoke flaps, just a round hole at the top of the tent.

Gallery

In popular culture 
In the book It by Stephen King, the members of the losers club build a pit in their club, which they fill with green branches and set them on fire to create smoke. One of them talks about the ritual use of smoke-holes by Native Americans.

References

External links

Traditional Native American dwellings
Architectural elements
Chimneys